Heladena is a genus in the Malpighiaceae, a family of about 75 genera of flowering plants in the order Malpighiales. Heladena includes one species, Heladena multiflora, a woody vine or sometimes a shrub or small tree native to gallery forests and woodlands of southern Brazil, Paraguay, and northeastern Argentina.

External links
Malpighiaceae Malpighiaceae - description, taxonomy, phylogeny, and nomenclature
Heladena

Flora of Argentina
Flora of Brazil
Flora of Paraguay
Malpighiaceae
Malpighiaceae genera
Monotypic Malpighiales genera